Singletrack is a UK-based mountain biking magazine and web site. The magazine is aimed at more mature mountain bikers and intended to provide a counterpoint to magazines such as MBUK which are aimed at a younger audience. It is based in Todmorden, West Yorkshire.

History and profile
Singletrack was founded in 2001 by Chipps Chippendale, Mark Alker and Shaun Murray. The magazine is currently published six times a year in both print and a variety of digital formats. In 2011 Singletrack published its first eBook - a collection of the previously published columns of Mike Ferrentino.

Singletrack grew from an earlier web site, GoFar, an acronym for 'Get Out For A Ride', which ran from 1998 to 2001 and was founded by Matt Wenham along with many contributors from the uk.rec.cycling Usenet newsgroup including Shaun Murray, Callum Wilson, Tony Raven, Russell Pinder, Myra VanInwegen and others, and from outside Usenet, Mark Alker, Carvel Lonsdale and many more. GoFar was largely a reaction to the death of the Future Publishing magazine Mountainbike World on which Chipps Chippendale once worked.

Singletrack magazine won the Best Cycling Magazine award in 2009 and 2010 - Awarded by Bikebiz trade magazine. In 2011 Singletrack also won the Northern Sports Awards, Best Website category. In May 2012 the Specialist Media Show awarded Singletrack a Media Pioneer Award for its approach to combining digital and print into a combined publishing strategy. Singletrackworld.com won best website 2013 awarded by Bikebiz trade magazine.

References
Bikebiz Award Winners 2009

External links

Sports magazines published in the United Kingdom
Cycling magazines published in the United Kingdom
Bi-monthly magazines published in the United Kingdom
Magazines established in 2001
Mountain biking magazines
Cycling websites